Uphill is a village in Weston-super-Mare, England.

Uphill may also refer to:

People
Dennis Uphill (1931–2007), an English footballer 
Malcolm Uphill (1935–1999), a Welsh motorcycle racer
Tom Uphill (1874–1962), a Canadian politician
Zoe Uphill (born 1982), an Australian rower

Places
Uphill, Ontario, part of Dalton Township, Ontario, Canada
Uphill, an area of Lincoln, England

See also

Downhill (disambiguation)
Kurixalus naso, the uphill tree frog